Virtanen (also written as Wirtanen) is a surname originating in Finland (in Finnish, meaning "river"), where it is the second most common surname. Notable people with the surname include:

Antti Virtanen (born 1977), Finnish ice hockey player
Artturi Ilmari Virtanen (1895–1973), Finnish chemist and Nobel laureate
Aulis Virtanen (1926–2006), Finnish sports journalist
Eino Virtanen (1908–1980), Finnish wrestler and Olympic medal winner
Fredrik Virtanen (born 1971), Swedish journalist
Jake Virtanen (born 1996), Canadian ice hockey winger
Jani Virtanen (born 1988), Finnish footballer
Janne Virtanen (born 1969), Finnish strongman
Kalle Virtanen (born 1975), singer and guitarist of the band Viikate
Kari Virtanen (born 1958), Finnish footballer
Keijo Virtanen (born 1945), Finnish historian
Rauha S. Virtanen (1931-2019), Finnish author
Reima Virtanen (born 1947), Finnish boxer and Olympic medal winner
Tommi Virtanen (born 1989), Finnish ice hockey goaltender
Veltto Virtanen (born 1951), psychologist, rock musician, member of parliament, presidential candidate
Ville Virtanen (actor) (born 1961), Finnish actor
Ville Virtanen, aka Darude (born 1973), Finnish DJ and music producer

People with the surname Wirtanen
Atos Wirtanen (1906–79), Ålandic-born Finnish politician
Carl A. Wirtanen (1910–1990), American astronomer
Petteri Wirtanen, Finnish ice hockey player
Tommy Wirtanen (born 1983), Finnish footballer
Toni Wirtanen (born 1975), singer of the band Apulanta

Fictional characters
B. Virtanen, lead character of the Ilkka Heilä comic strip of the same name
 Virtanen (no first name), hero of Tango is my passion by M.A. Numminen
 Lukas Virtanen, main character of Mark of the Vasirian and subsequent books from the Blackthorn Saga by author Stephanie Denne.

References

Finnish-language surnames